Benevenuto Daciolo Fonseca dos Santos (born 30 March 1976), known as Cabo Daciolo (Corporal Daciolo in English), is a Brazilian military firefighter and politician affiliated to the Democratic Labour Party (PDT). In 2014, he was elected federal deputy. He was expelled from the Socialism and Liberty Party (PSOL) in 2015 and later affiliated himself to the Labour Party of Brazil (PTdoB) (later Avante) and then to Patriota.

Daciolo gained notoriety in 2011, when he was one of the leaders of the firefighters' strike in Rio de Janeiro. The strikes occupied the headquarters of the corporation and camped in the staircases of the Legislative Assembly of Rio de Janeiro (ALERJ). Daciolo was arrested and detained for nine days in the Gericinó Penitentiary Complex.

He ran for President of Brazil in the 2018 elections, gaining 1.3% of the popular vote and coming in 6th place.

Personal life
He is married to Cristiane Daciolo and is a father to three children.

Electoral results

Presidential elections

References

External links
 

1976 births
Brazilian evangelicals
Living people
People from Florianópolis
Members of the Chamber of Deputies (Brazil) from Rio de Janeiro (state)
Brazilian conspiracy theorists
Brazilian nationalists
Brazilian firefighters
Patriota politicians
Democratic Labour Party (Brazil) politicians